The History of India, as Told by Its Own Historians is a book comprising translations of medieval Persian chronicles based on the work of Henry Miers Elliot. It was originally published as a set of eight volumes between 1867-1877 in London. The translations were in part overseen by Elliot, whose efforts were then extended and edited posthumously by John Dowson.

The book has been reprinted several times, and is also available online. Elliot was keen to contrast what he saw as the justice and efficiency of the British rule compared to cruelty and despotism of Muslim rule. He expressed hope that it "will make our native subjects more sensible of the immense advantages accruing to them under the mildness and equity of our rule."

Background

Henry Miers Elliot was born in 1808. He was an administrator who worked for the British East India Company (EIC) and rose to the position of foreign secretary under the Governor-Generalships of Henry Hardinge and James Broun-Ramsay, 1st Marquess of Dalhousie. His academic capability in oriental languages, classics and mathematics enabled him to pass the open entrance examination for the EIC in 1826, foregoing the place at New College, Oxford that he had been expected to attend.

Elliot's interest in studies of India was indulged as a leisure pursuit throughout his time in the country and arose out of researches made by him in attempts to develop policies relating to land and revenue. British historians of India, such as Mountstuart Elphinstone, had largely ignored the rural aristocracy and fiscal matters, which Elliot believed could usefully be investigated by resort to hitherto neglected medieval chronicles. He saw his Bibliographical Index to the Historians of Mohammedan India , published in 1849, as a prelude to a study of 231 Arabic and Persian historians of India and also a resource that would prove to be of benefit to future historians. He said that he wanted his researches to be 

Ill-health prevented Elliot from completing his more detailed study: he left India in search of a more amenable climate and died in 1853 at Simonstown, South Africa.

John Dowson was asked by Elliot's widow, Rebecca, to complete the work of her husband. Dowson had been born in 1820 and had held various teaching posts relating to oriental languages, of which he seems likely to have mastered Arabic, Persian, Sanskrit, Telugu and Hindustani. Those posts included a period as tutor at the EIC's Haileybury college, a professorship at University College, London and, from around 1859 until 1877, a professorship at the Staff College, Camberley. His efforts based on the work of Elliot resulted in the eight volumes titled The History of India, as Told by its Own Historians: the Muhammadan Period, published in London by Trübner & Co between 1867 and 1877. Around half of the material extracted from Elliot's bibliographic index were translated by Dowson himself and, according to Katherine Prior, he also left his mark by giving "... more of a historical emphasis than Elliot had planned." Some years later, Dowson began work on a volume concerning medieval Gujarat that was also based on Elliot's papers. This was incomplete at the time of his death in 1881 and was later published in a completely different form — as The History of India, as Told by Its Own Historians: The Local Muhammadan Dynasties: Gujarat — under the editorship of Edward Clive Bayley.

Assessments
The literary work of Elliot was criticised around the time of his death. Francis H. Robinson wrote in 1853 that Elliot's evangelical trait tended to "criminate" those about whom he wrote. Dowson's academic reputation was established through his involvement in the project, although he did receive some criticism both of his competence and methods. Prior notes that, "Ironically, in the longer term, the apparent comprehensiveness of his work seriously retarded scholarly re-examination of the manuscripts on which it was based".

In 1903, Stanley Lane-Poole praised the efforts of Elliot and Dowson but also cautioned about it, saying: 

Another Francis Robinson, writing in 2010, notes that the Elliott and Dowson work "... should always be read with Peter Hardy's Historians of Medieval India (Delhi, 1997) to hand."

Ramya Sreenivasan explains that the early and medieval historiography of India has often been approached in the form of dichotomic Hindu and Muslim categories, two strands of mutually exclusive political outlooks and cultures that have their origins in the two literary epic forms that generally, but not always, are typical of those periods. She notes that the effects of this can be seen in the works of later historians such as James Tod, another EIC administrator and gentleman-scholar, who strenuously favoured the notion of Hindu chivalry and Muslim deceitfulness while working in Rajputana. 

Richard Eaton believes that present-day Hindu nationalists have "selectively used" Elliot and Dowson's "selective translations" in their efforts to denigrate pre-modern Muslim rulers. He says that

Criticisms

Eaton states that Elliot saw the British rule as much superior in contrast to the Muslim rule and "was anything but sympathetic" to the Muhammadan period of Indian history. Elliot notes of far greater advantages to Indians than under Muslim rule and expressed hope that it "will make our native subjects more sensible of the immense advantages accruing to them under the mildness and equity of our rule."

Mohammad Habib, a nationalist historian who had presented his own secular view of Indian history by challenging the historical and translation methods of European colonial historians like Elliot, criticized him for focusing "inordinately" on the political activities of Muslim rulers instead of focusing on the lives of the people and their cultural activities. He blamed it on Elliot's reliance on faulty translations and not recognising the historical value of literary and cultural sources like masnavis and maktubat (Sufi literature).

Contents
The contents are not complete translations of works. A. J. Arberry notes the Tabakat-i Nasiri, Tarikh-i Firoz Shahi and Zafarnama as being among those of which only parts were published (though in the last case, a chronicle of Timur, only a small part of the book concerned India). Arberry also points out that the quality of sources selected was variable and that the documents from which the translations were made were sometimes but one version of several that were available.

Volume I: Introduction 
 Early Arab Geographers
 Historians of Sind

Volume II: To the Year A.D. 1260

Volume III: To the Year A.D. 1398

Volume IV: To the Year A.D. 1450

Volume V: End of the Afghan Dynasty and the First Thirty-Eight Years of the Reign of Akbar

Volume VI: Akbar and Jahangir

Volume VII: From Shah-Jahan to the Early Years of the Reign of Muhammad Shah

Volume VIII: To End of the Muhammadan Empire in India

See also
 History of India
 Mughal Empire
 Muslim conquests in the Indian subcontinent
 History of Pakistan
 History of Bangladesh

References
Notes

Citations

Bibliography

Further reading

External links

 
 
---Volume 1
---Volume 2
---Volume 3
---Volume 4
---Volume 5
---Volume 6
---Volume 7
---Volume 8
 The History of India, as Told by Its Own Historians. The Muhammadan Period; by Sir H. M. Elliot; Edited by John Dowson; London Trubner Company 1867–1877 Vol I-VIII. Posted by: Packard Humanities Institute; Persian Texts in Translation
 

1867 non-fiction books
History books about India
1877 non-fiction books
1860s non-fiction books
1870s non-fiction books
Books about the Mughal Empire
19th-century Indian literature
Translations into English